Sue Spencer is an Australian journalist and television producer.

Biography
Spencer is perhaps best known for her work on ABC Television's current affairs program Four Corners, where she initially commenced working as a researcher and producer in 1985 before becoming the program's executive producer in 2007.

Spencer has won four Walkley Awards, most recently for Most Outstanding Contribution to Journalism in 2019. In 1993 she was a co-recipient of the Gold Walkley with Phillip Chubb for the four-part documentary series Labor in Power.

References 

Living people
Australian television producers
21st-century Australian journalists
Australian women journalists
Australian women television producers
Year of birth missing (living people)